Yeda may refer to:
Yeda Crusius (born 1944), Brazilian economist, politician, governor
Yeda Pessoa de Castro, Brazilian ethnolinguist
Yeda Peak, volcano and highest peak in the Spectrum Range of the Boundary Ranges of northwestern  British Columbia, Canada
 Yantai Economic and Technological Development Zone, Shandong Province, China
 Yeda Research and Development Company, the technology transfer organization for the Weizmann Institute of Science in Israel
Etadunna Airstrip, ICAO airport code "YEDA"